Camon is a commune in the Somme department in Hauts-de-France in northern France.

Geography
The commune lies on the right bank of the river Somme, adjacent to the east of Amiens.

Population

Places of interest
 The sixteenth century church

See also
Communes of the Somme department

References

Communes of Somme (department)